Matija "Matt" Jaukovic (born 17 November 1985) is an Australian and former Montenegrin competitive swimmer. He is a former world record-holder in the short course 50 metre butterfly. Over the course of his career he has also held Commonwealth, Oceanian, Australian national, and Australian All Comers records in the short course 50 metre butterfly as well as an Australian All Comers record in the 100 metre butterfly. He won a total of 10 medals in international competitions, all at the FINA Swimming World Cup, seven of which were gold medals and three of which were silver medals. Before competing representing Australia, he set a Montenegrin national record in the 100 metre backstroke.

Early life and education
Jaukovic was born in Montenegro before moving to Australia to study law and gaining Australian citizenship.

Swimming career

2004 European Aquatics Championships
Jaukovic represented Montenegro, competing as part of the joined Montenegro and Serbia (SCG) team, at the 2004 European Aquatics Championships in Madrid, Spain. He set a Montenegrin national record in the prelims heats of the 100 metre backstroke with a time of 59.39 seconds, ranked 33rd overall and did not advance to the semifinals.

2008 Australian Short Course Championships
At the 2008 Australian Short Course Swimming Championships held in Melbourne in September, Jaukovic set a new Australian All Comers record in the 100 metre butterfly with his time of 50.37 seconds, breaking the approximately eight-year-old record set by Geoff Huegill at 50.71 seconds.

2008 FINA Swimming World Cup

Stop 3: Sydney

Jaukovic started competition in the 2008 FINA Swimming World Cup at the third stop of the competition circuit, swimming a time of 23.00 seconds in the prelims heats of the 50 metre butterfly and qualifying for the final ranking first overall. In the final of the 50 metre butterfly, Jaukovic won the gold medal in the event with a world record and World Cup record time of 22.50 seconds, finishing 0.99 seconds ahead of the next fastest swimmer, and earning 1039 points on the FINA scoring system for his swim. His time of 22.50 seconds broke the world record set over two years earlier by Kaio Almeida of Brazil at 22.60 seconds. With his world record in the 50 metre butterly, he became the third Australian swimmer to hold the world record in the event after Michael Klim and Geoff Huegill. The next day, 26 October, he competed in the prelims heats of the 100 metre butterfly, qualifying for the final ranking first with his time of 51.83 seconds. He wrapped up his competition at the Sydney World Cup stop with a second gold medal, this time in the 100 metre butterfly where he finished first with a time of 50.50 seconds in the final.

Stop 4: Singapore

After arriving in Singapore for the fourth stop of the World Cup, Jaukovic competed in his first event on the first day of competition, 1 November, advancing to the final of the 50 metre butterfly after swimming a 23.27 in the prelims heats. Later the same day, he won the gold medal in the final with a time of 22.82 seconds, finishing over two tenths of a second ahead of silver medalist Yevgeny Korotyshkin of Russia. The second and final day of competition in Singapore, Jaukovic qualified for the final of the 100 metre butterfly with his time of 51.90 seconds that ranked his fastest overall in the prelims heats. In the final, he won the silver medal with his time of 51.46 seconds, only being out-touched at the wall by Yevgeny Korotyshkin.

Stop 5: Moscow

Moving on to his third World Cup stop, and the fifth stop of the World Cup circuit this time held in Moscow, Russia, Jaukovic once again started competition on day one, 8 November, with the prelims heats of the 50 metre butterfly, finishing with a time of 23.29 seconds and qualifying for the final ranked first overall. In the final he won his third gold medal of the World Cup circuit in the event, finishing less than two tenths of a second ahead of Kohei Kawamoto of Japan in a time of 23.12 seconds. The next day Jaukovic ranked first across all prelims heats in the 100 metre butterfly with a swim of 51.45 seconds, advancing to the final later in the day. Come race time in the final, he swam a 50.68 to earn the gold medal in the event, narrowly touching ahead of Yevgeny Korotyshkin by four hundredths of a second.

Stop 6: Stockholm

On 11 November, the first day of competition of the World Cup stop in Stockholm, Sweden, Jaukovic ranked first in the prelims heats of the 50 metre butterfly with his time of 23.02, which was about a quarter of a second ahead of the second ranked swimmer, Lyndon Ferns of South Africa. In the final of the event later the same day, Jaukovic won his fourth gold medal in the 50 metre butterfly with a time of 22.85 seconds, making it his fourth consecutive gold medal in the race at FINA Swimming World Cup competition. The following day, 12 November, he advanced to the final of the 100 metre butterfly with a time of 51.72 seconds and overall number one ranking from the prelims heats. Jaukovic won the silver medal in the final with a personal best time of 50.31 seconds and was flanked in finishing by two Russian swimmers, with Yevgeny Korotyshkin taking the gold medal and Nikolay Skvortsov winning the bronze medal.

Stop 7: Berlin

At the seventh and final stop of the 2008 World Cup circuit, held in Berlin, Germany, Jaukovic commenced competition on the first day, 15 November, finishing ranked first in the prelims heats of the 50 metre butterfly with a time of 23.10 seconds. In the final he went five-for-five, winning his fifth gold medal out of a possible five gold medals, in the 50 metre butterfly with a time of 22.58 seconds that was just eight hundredths of a second off his own world record time, two hundredths of a second faster than the former world record of 22.60 seconds by Kaio Almeida, and three tenths of a second faster than second-place finisher Johannes Dietrich of Germany. On 16 November in his last event of the World Cup circuit, the 100 metre butterfly, Jaukovic ranked second overall in the prelims heats with a time of 51.81 seconds and advanced to the final. In the evening final, he won his third silver medal of the World Cup circuit in the event with a time of 50.70 seconds and finished only behind Yevgeny Korotyshkin who won the gold medal in the event with a new World Cup record time of 49.74 seconds.

2009 Australian Short Course Championships
In August, at the 2009 Australian Short Course Swimming Championships in Hobart, Jaukovic lowered his personal best time in the 50 metre butterfly to a 22.28 and setting new Oceanian, Commonwealth, Australian, and Australian All Comers records in the event. The Oceanian and Australian records remained unbroken for over 12 years until Kyle Chalmers swam representing Australia at the 2021 FINA Swimming World Cup and broke the records with a time of 22.24 seconds.

Career best times

World records

Representing Australia

Short course metres (25 m pool)

Continental and national records

Representing Montenegro

Long course metres (50 m pool)

Representing Australia

Short course metres (25 m pool)

See also
 World record progression 50 metres butterfly
 Montenegrin Australians

References

External links
 

1985 births
Living people
Australian male butterfly swimmers
World record setters in swimming
Montenegrin emigrants to Australia
Naturalised citizens of Australia